The 12-inch MacBook (also called the Retina MacBook, officially marketed as the new MacBook) is a discontinued Mac laptop made by Apple Inc., which sat between the MacBook Air and MacBook Pro in Apple's laptop lineup.

It was introduced in March 2015. It was more compact than any other notebook in the MacBook family at the time and included a Retina display, fanless design, a Butterfly keyboard with lower key travel. It only had a single USB-C port, used for both power and data, as well as a 3.5mm headphone jack. It was released in 2015, revised in 2017, and discontinued in July 2019, a year after the release of the MacBook Air with Retina display.

Overview 

The MacBook was announced at an Apple special event on March 9, 2015, and was released a month later on April 10. It employed Intel's Broadwell Core M processors at a TDP of around 4.5 Watt to allow for a fanless design and a logic board that is much smaller than in previous MacBooks. It had a similar appearance to the MacBook Air, but was thinner and lighter, offered (at the time of introduction) more storage and memory and a higher-resolution 2304×1440 Retina display, but lower processor and graphics performance. The MacBook has at times been available in space gray, silver, and gold finishes.

The MacBook has only two ports, a 3.5 mm headphone jack and a single, multi-purpose USB-C port; it was the first Mac with USB-C. The port supports transmission speeds of up to 5 Gbit/s, and can be used for data, and audio/video output, and charging; it was the first MacBook without MagSafe charging. Apple markets an adapter that can provide a full-size USB connector, and a "Digital AV Multiport Adapter" with a charging pass-through, full-size USB port, and HDMI output. Although Thunderbolt 3 technology uses USB-C connectors, the MacBook's USB-C port does not support Thunderbolt. It was one of only two Macs, along with the 2012 Mac Pro, to not support Thunderbolt since it was introduced to Macs in 2011. Thunderbolt devices, such as storage media and the Apple Thunderbolt Display, are not compatible. Shortly after the MacBook's introduction, various companies began announcing cables and adapters for the USB-C port.

Despite its small size, it features a full-sized keyboard and a large trackpad. The MacBook introduced a new Butterfly keyboard, with traditional scissor mechanism keys replaced with a new, Apple-designed butterfly mechanism, making the keyboard thinner and, as Apple claims, individual keys more stable. The keyboard's backlight no longer consisted of a row of LEDs and a light guide panel, but instead used a single LED for each key. It also introduced the Force Touch trackpad, a solid-state trackpad that measures pressure sensitivity, and replicates a click with haptic feedback. The trackpad was later brought to the Magic Trackpad 2 and the 2015 MacBook Pro. A similar technology (3D Touch) is also used in the Apple Watch and introduced with the iPhone 6S.

The aluminum enclosure was 13.1 mm at its thickest point at the hinge end. The battery was custom-designed to fill the available space in the small enclosure. It uses a new 39.7 watt-hour lithium-polymer terraced battery cell which was advertised to provide "all day" battery life. Apple claimed nine hours of Internet browsing or ten hours of iTunes movie playback. The battery was improved in the 2016 refresh, with Apple claiming ten hours for Internet browsing, and eleven hours of iTunes movie playback. The MacBook did not include any beryllium, BFRs, or PVCs in its construction. The display was made of arsenic-free glass. It was made of recyclable materials such as aluminum and glass, meets Energy Star 6.1 standards, and was rated EPEAT Gold.

On April 19, 2016, Apple updated the MacBook with Skylake Core M processors, Intel HD 515 graphics, faster memory, longer battery life, faster storage and a new rose gold finish.

On June 5, 2017, Apple updated the MacBook with Intel Kaby Lake m3, i5, and i7 processors (previously known as m3, m5, and m7). It featured the second-generation butterfly keyboard, which introduced new symbols for the control and option keys. It also features faster storage and memory.

On October 30, 2018, Apple quietly eliminated two color options (rose gold and the original gold) and added a new color option (new gold) to match the MacBook Air's 2018 color scheme.

On July 9, 2019, Apple quietly discontinued the MacBook line.

On June 7, 2021, Apple released macOS Monterey which dropped support for Early 2015 model MacBook.

On June 30, 2021, Apple added the Early 2015 model MacBook to its "vintage products" list, making it eligible for only limited product support.

On June 6, 2022, Apple released macOS Ventura which dropped support for the Early 2016 model MacBook. As of June 2022, only the last 2017 model MacBook is capable of running the latest macOS version.

Design 

Externally, the MacBook follows the design of the MacBook Air with a tapered aluminum enclosure. It has a flush screen with black bezels similar to the MacBook Pro. The Apple logo on the rear of the display is glossy and opaque, rather than backlit and white as seen on every Apple notebook since the 1999 PowerBook G3 and 2001 iBook. It is the thinnest and lightest notebook Apple has produced to date, 0.52 inches (1.32 cm) at its thickest point, and 2.03 pounds (0.92 kg).

The letters on the MacBook's keyboard and the model name at the bottom of the screen bezel are in the San Francisco typeface, whereas previous notebooks made by Apple used VAG Rounded.

Apple's introduction of a gold MacBook finish had been cited as an example of positioning itself as a luxury-style brand. The choice follows the introduction of the gold iPhone 5S after Apple found that gold was seen as a popular sign of a luxury among Chinese customers.

Reception 
Reception for the MacBook was mixed. Critics praised the design and overall quality of the product, with some regarding it as a potential successor to the MacBook Air, as the Air had an aging design and low resolution screen. However, Apple continued to offer the MacBook Air while selling the MacBook at considerably higher price. Several described the MacBook as a limited first-generation proof-of-concept design for early adopters, and recommended against buying the MacBook until it reached greater maturity, and its price dropped sufficiently for mainstream adoption. The slow performance of the Intel Core M processor was regarded as the new MacBook's main deficiency, relative to the cheaper and faster MacBook Air and MacBook Pro. Among the other criticisms of the new MacBook are the lack of various popular ports, particularly USB Type-A ports, and that it only contains a single port which limits data transfer and overall convenience without the use of an adapter.

The keyboard received considerable criticism as being poor for long-term use: developer Marco Arment described the notebook's build and small size as "absolutely amazing, revolutionary, and mind-blowing... until you need to use the keyboard for something." He also criticised the trackpad as worse than on previous MacBooks, and said that he would be returning the model he had bought.

A report by AppleInsider had claimed that the updated butterfly keyboard fails twice as often as previous models, often due to particles stuck beneath the keys. Repairs for stuck keys have been estimated to cost more than $700. In May 2018, two class action lawsuits were filed against Apple regarding the keyboard issue with one alleging a "constant threat of nonresponsive keys and accompanying keyboard failure" and accusing Apple of not alerting consumers to the issue. In June 2018, Apple announced a Service Program to "service eligible MacBook and MacBook Pro keyboards, free of charge".

Technical specifications

Supported operating systems

Supported macOS releases

Supported Windows versions

Timeline

See also 

 MacBook Air
 MacBook Pro

Notes

References

External links 

  – official site

2015-2019
X86 Macintosh computers
Computer-related introductions in 2015
Products and services discontinued in 2019
Discontinued Apple Inc. products